Japan competed at the 2012 Winter Youth Olympics in Innsbruck, Austria.

Medalists

|  style="text-align:left; width:78%; vertical-align:top;"|

|  style="text-align:left; width:22%; vertical-align:top;"|

Alpine Skiing

One coach.
Boys

Girls

Bobsleigh

Girls

Cross-country skiing

One coach.
Boys

Girls

Sprint

Curling

One team leader.

Mixed Team
Boys
 Skip
 Second
Girls
 Third
 Lead

Round-robin standings

Round-robin results

Draw 1

Draw 2

Draw 3

Draw 4

Draw 5

Draw 6

Draw 7

Quarterfinals

Mixed doubles

Round of 32

Round of 16

Quarterfinals

Semifinals

Bronze Medal Game

Figure skating

One team leader and two coaches.

Boys

Girls

Mixed

Freestyle Skiing

One coach.

Ski Cross

Ski Half-Pipe

Ice Hockey

One manager.
Boys

Girls

Nordic Combined

One coach.
Boys

Short Track

One coach.
Boys

Girls

 * Given advantage due to interference by anothersakter

Mixed

Skeleton

Boys

Girls

Ski jumping

Two coaches.
Boys

Girls

Team w/Nordic Combined

Snowboarding

One manager.
Boys

Girls

Speed Skating

One manager.
Boys

Girls

See also
Japan at the 2012 Summer Olympics

References

General

2012 in Japanese sport
Nations at the 2012 Winter Youth Olympics
Japan at the Youth Olympics